The Presbytery of Edinburgh was one of the presbyteries of the Church of Scotland, being the local presbytery for Edinburgh. Its boundary was almost identical to that of the City of Edinburgh Council area (i.e. also including Kirkliston and South Queensferry).

The last Clerk was the Reverend Marjorie McPherson. The Presbytery had represented and supervised 83 Church of Scotland congregations within the area.
On 1 January 2022 the presbytery was merged with West Lothian Presbytery to form the Presbytery of Edinburgh and West Lothian. (https://westlothianpresbytery.org.uk/ )

Congregations

See also
Church of Scotland
List of Church of Scotland synods and presbyteries

External links
Presbytery of Edinburgh

References

Edinburgh
Christianity in Edinburgh